Perales Airport  is an airport serving the city of Ibagué in the Tolima Department of Colombia.

There is high terrain north and west of the airport.

The airport underwent a major renovation that was completed in June 2018.

Airlines and destinations

See also
 Transport in Colombia
 List of airports in Colombia

References

External links 
 OpenStreetMap - Perales
 OurAirports - Perales
 SkyVector - Perales
 

Airports in Colombia
Buildings and structures in Tolima Department